On 11 February 1978, Pacific Western Airlines Flight 314, a Boeing 737-200, crashed at Cranbrook/Canadian Rockies International Airport, near Cranbrook, British Columbia, Canada, killing 43 of the 49 people on board.

The scheduled flight from Fort McMurray International Airport to Castlegar Airport via Edmonton, Alberta, Calgary, Alberta and Cranbrook, British Columbia crashed after its thrust reversers did not fully stow following an aborted landing to avoid a snowplow on the runway. Calgary air traffic control was in major error in its calculation of the flight's arrival time at Cranbrook, and the flight crew did not report while passing a beacon on final approach.

Aircraft and crew 
The aircraft involved was a Boeing 737-275 that was nearly eight years old at the time of the accident. It was powered by two Pratt & Whitney JT8D-9A turbofan engines.

The captain was 30-year-old Chris Miles, who had been with Pacific Western Airlines since 1967 and became a Boeing 737 captain 10 years later in 1977. He had 5,173 flight hours, including 2,780 hours on the Boeing 737. The first officer was 25-year-old Peter Van Oort, who had been with the airline since 1971 and became a 737 first officer in 1977. He was less experienced than captain Miles, having logged 1,316 flight hours, but only 81 of them were on the Boeing 737.

Accident
Flight 314 departed Calgary at 12:32 on an estimated 23-minute flight to Cranbrook. This estimate was passed to Cranbrook by Calgary Air Traffic Control. Cranbrook was not a controlled airport, and while it had an "aero-radio" station to provide weather and advisory information to aircraft, it had no control tower or air traffic controllers. As it was snowing, equipment operator Terry George was sent out to clear the runway with a snowplow and would be called off the runway shortly before Flight 314's arrival.

As Flight 314 neared Cranbrook airport, it was snowing with a visibility of 3/4-mile (about ), and a snow removal vehicle was clearing the runway. The Cranbrook aero-radio operator advised George of the estimated arrival of Flight 314 at 13:05. Flight 314 was expected to report on the approach when passing the "Skookum Beacon", which would give about seven minutes notice of arrival at Cranbrook. At 12:46 Flight 314 contacted Cranbrook Aeradio and was passed the latest weather and runway information. One minute later, Cranbrook Aeradio advised Flight 314 that there was a snowplow out on the runway removing snow. First Officer Van Oort acknowledged this with "Three Fourteen checks".

Upon passing the Skookum beacon, Captain Miles elected not to do a customary circle and proceeded for a straight in approach into Runway 16 at Cranbrook. For reasons unknown, the pilots did not report passing the beacon nor did they report that they were on final approach, which meant that aeradio operator believed the flight would arrive at 13:05 and did not call Terry George off the runway. The pilots did not see the snowplow due to poor visibility and because the snowplow produced a plume of snow which obscured it. Captain Miles brought the throttles to idle and engaged reverse thrust, deploying the two thrust reversers, but just two seconds later saw the snowplow about 1,000 feet ahead of him. Terry George saw in his rearview mirror the 737 coming straight at him and desperately swerved to get out of its way but wouldn't be able to get out of the way in time. To avoid a fatal collision, Miles immediately disengaged reverse thrust and both pilots slammed the throttle levers all the way forward and pulled back on their control columns to get the 737 back in the air and go-around. They pushed so hard on the throttles that Miles fractured his thumb. George radioed, "Where the hell did he come from?". The aeradio operator responded, "I don't know Terry, but he sure didn't call after his first call."

When reverse thrust was cancelled, the plane lifted off so soon that the hydraulic isolation valve in the left thrust reverser closed, in doing so cutting off power to the actuator, with the reverser doors five centimeters open and the isolation valve in the partially open position. Flight 314 was now in a high drag configuration close to the ground, at a low speed, and with a deployed thrust reverser. Evidence indicates that First Officer Van Oort took off his seatbelt and stood up to flick the reverser override switch which would restore hydraulic pressure to the reverser to close it. He raised the flaps from 40° to 15°, but the landing gear remained locked in the down position. Van Oort managed to open the safety cap to the switch, but Captain Miles (possibly because of the intense pain of his fractured thumb) let off the right rudder, throwing the co-pilot off balance and he never flipped the switch. By this point the airspeed had decayed so much that no amount of aileron or rudder could be effective enough to save the plane. Captain Miles shouted over the radio "We're gonna crash!". Ten seconds after going around, the 737 crashed to the left of the runway banked 90° to the left and 30° nose down. The aircraft was destroyed in the impact and subsequent fire with only the cockpit and the tail section being the recognizable parts of the aircraft. Terry George got out of the snowplow and he with two firefighters rushed towards the crash site. They found six survivors including one flight attendant with one additional survivor being found in the forward section of the aircraft who suffered a severe head injury. This person died 11 days later in hospital. 43 people including Captain Chris Miles and First Officer Peter Van Oort were killed in the crash.

Investigation
The crash investigation was conducted by the Aviation Safety Investigation Division of Transport Canada and audited by the Aircraft Accident Review Board. The Cockpit Voice Recorder (CVR) was destroyed by the intense fire but the Flight Data Recorder (FDR) was useable though some parameters were unreadable. Boeing simulations showed that the aircraft was controllable with one engine at idle reverse and the other at full forward thrust in a gear up, flaps 15° configuration. With flaps 25 and gear down, it was not possible to maintain level flight. The go-around would have been successful if the left engine thrust reverser doors had not been deployed.

In popular culture 
The events of the crash featured in an episode of the History channel documentary Disasters of the Century, entitled "Collision Course".

See also 

 Lauda Air Flight 004
 TAM Transportes Aéreos Regionais Flight 402

References

Airliner accidents and incidents in Canada
Accidents and incidents involving the Boeing 737 Original
Pacific Western Airlines accidents and incidents
Disasters in British Columbia
1978 in Canada
Airliner accidents and incidents caused by mechanical failure
Airliner accidents and incidents caused by pilot error
Aviation accidents and incidents caused by air traffic controller error
Aviation accidents and incidents in 1978
February 1978 events in North America